Anatoliy Vasilyovych Demyanenko (born 19 February 1959), sometimes referred to as Anatoli Demianenko, is a Ukrainian football coach and former player. As a player, he was deployed at left-back and notably represented Dynamo Kyiv and the USSR national team.

Playing career
Demyanenko began his football career as a student of the Dnipro-75 football school in his home city of Dnipropetrovsk. He was added to the squad of the local Dnipro Dnipropetrovsk of the Soviet Top League in the 1975 season. However, he debuted for the main team of Dnipro in the 1978 season. By the end of that season he had played 20 games and scored 1 goal.

In 1979 Romensky played couple of games for Ukraine at the Spartakiad of the Peoples of the USSR.

Demyanenko was a longtime Dynamo Kyiv captain and a prolific left-footed player for the Soviet Union who could patrol the entire flank from defence to offence. In December 2000 he was voted the 3rd best player in the Ukrainian 'Team of the Century' according to a poll by The Ukrainsky Futbol weekly, behind Andrei Shevchenko and Oleg Blokhin. Demyanenko is fourth in the all time caps records for the USSR and played in three World Cups for them.

Coaching career
Demyanenko started out his coaching career with FC CSKA Kyiv in 1993. After the Army men merged with FC Boryspil became a member of the coaching staff newly formed FC CSKA-Borysfen Kyiv. Already next season Demyanenko joined Dynamo Kyiv in 1994. Until 2005 he was a regular coach of the Dynamo's big coaching staff then he was offered to become the manager. During this time he won the Ukrainian Premier League once in 2006–07. He also won the Ukrainian Cups 2005–06, and 2006–07. Following several defeats of Dynamo Kyiv early on in the 2007–08 season, Demyanenko resigned coaching Dynamo in September 2007.

In January 2008, Demyanenko became the coach of Neftchi Baku in Azerbaijan, following the sacking of their coach Vlastimil Petržela. Demyanenko made history in Azerbaijan, making Neftchi become the first club that managed to get to the third round of UEFA Cup Qualification. However, he was sacked after the Azerbaijan Premier League started and he lost the first two games.

Personal life
Anatoliy is a father of a Ukrainian football midfielder Denys Demyanenko (born 2000), currently playing for Desna Chernihiv.

Career statistics

Club 

The statistics in USSR Cups and Europe is made under the scheme "autumn-spring" and enlisted in a year of start of tournaments

International

Scores and results list the Soviet Union's goal tally first, score column indicates score after each Demyanenko goal.

Honours

Player 
Club
 USSR Championship: 1980, 1981, 1985, 1986, 1990
 USSR Cup: 1982, 1985, 1987, 1990
 USSR Super Cup: 1980, 1985, 1986
 UEFA Cup Winners Cup: 1986
 Trofeo Santiago Bernabéu: 1986
 Ukrainian Championship: 1993
 Ukrainian Cup: 1993

Individual
UEFA European Under-21 Football Championship Golden Player: 1980
 Ukrainian Footballer of the Year: 1982, 1985
 Soviet Footballer of the Year: 1985

Manager
Dynamo Kyiv
 Ukrainian Premier League: 2006–07
 Ukrainian Cup: 2005–06, 2006–07

Nasaf Qarshi
 AFC Cup: 2011
 Uzbek League runner-up: 2011
 Uzbek Cup runner-up: 2011

References

External links 
 Demyanenko's Profile on Neftchi Baku Site 
 
 
 

1959 births
Living people
Soviet footballers
Soviet expatriate footballers
Ukrainian footballers
Ukrainian football managers
Ukrainian expatriate footballers
Soviet expatriate sportspeople in East Germany
Expatriate footballers in East Germany
Expatriate footballers in Poland
Ukrainian expatriate sportspeople in Poland
FC Dynamo Kyiv players
FC Dynamo-2 Kyiv players
1. FC Magdeburg players
Widzew Łódź players
Soviet Top League players
Ukrainian Premier League players
Ekstraklasa players
1982 FIFA World Cup players
1986 FIFA World Cup players
UEFA Euro 1988 players
1990 FIFA World Cup players
Soviet Union international footballers
FC CSKA Kyiv managers
FC Dynamo Kyiv managers
FC Dnipro players
Neftçi PFK managers
Expatriate football managers in Azerbaijan
FC Nasaf managers
FC Volyn Lutsk managers
FC Nitra managers
Ukrainian expatriate sportspeople in Azerbaijan
Ukrainian expatriate sportspeople in Uzbekistan
Ukrainian expatriate sportspeople in Slovakia
Expatriate football managers in Uzbekistan
Ukrainian Premier League managers
Ukrainian Second League managers
Azerbaijan Premier League managers
Uzbekistan Super League managers
Slovak Super Liga managers
Footballers from Dnipro
Ukrainian expatriate football managers
Expatriate football managers in Slovakia
DDR-Oberliga players
Association football defenders
AFC Cup winning managers
Recipients of the Order of Merit (Ukraine), 1st class